Mark A. Magnuson is an American biologist, currently the Louise B. McGavock Professor of Molecular Physiology and Biophysics, Medicine, and Cell and Developmental Biology at Vanderbilt University.

References

Year of birth missing (living people)
Living people
Vanderbilt University faculty
21st-century American biologists
University of Iowa alumni
Luther College (Iowa) alumni